Dr. Charles A. Ofria is a Professor in the Department of Computer Science and Engineering at Michigan State University, the director of the Digital Evolution (DEvo) Lab there, and Director of the BEACON Center for the Study of Evolution in Action. He is the son of the late Charles Ofria, who developed the first fully integrated shop management program for the automotive repair industry. Ofria attended Stuyvesant High School and graduated from Ward Melville High School in 1991. He obtained a B.S. in Computer Science, Pure Mathematics, and Applied Mathematics from Stony Brook University in 1994, and a Ph.D. in Computation and Neural Systems from the California Institute of Technology in 1999. Ofria's research focuses on the interplay between computer science and Darwinian evolution.

Ofria is one of the designers of Avida, an artificial life software platform to study the evolutionary biology of self-replicating and evolving computer programs (digital organisms, see also Digital organism simulators). Avida has been used extensively to study the basic processes that underlie Darwinian evolution. Avida is under active development in Ofria's Digital Evolution Lab at Michigan State University and was originally designed by Ofria, Chris Adami and C. Titus Brown at Caltech in 1993.

Honors
Ofria received the NSF Career Award in 2007 and the Withrow Excellence Award for Excellence in Teaching in 2010 and for Excellence in Research in 2006 and 2016.  He was also a 2017 winner of the William J. Beal Outstanding Faculty Award.

Representative journal publications

 Clune J, Pennock RT, Ofria C, Lenski RE (2012) Ontogeny tends to recapitulate phylogeny in digital organisms" The American Naturalist 180: E54–E63. (pdf)
 Clune J, Goldsby HJ, Ofria C, and Pennock RT (2011) Selective pressures for accurate altruism targeting: Evidence from digital evolution for difficult-to-test aspects of inclusive fitness theory. Proceedings of the Royal Society. 278: 666-674.  (PDF)
 Clune J, Stanley KO, Pennock RT, Ofria C (2011) On the performance of indirect encoding across the continuum of regularity. IEEE Transactions on Evolutionary Computation. 15(3): 346-367. (PDF)
 Clune J, Misevic D, Ofria C, Lenski RE, Elena SF, and Sanjuán R. Natural selection fails to optimize mutation rates for long-term adaptation on rugged fitness landscapes
 Ofria C, Huang W and Torng E. On the gradual evolution of complexity and the sudden emergence of complex features
Elena SF, Wilke CO, Ofria C, and Lenski RE. Effects of population size and mutation rate on the evolution of mutational robustness
Ostrowski E, Ofria C, and Lenski RE, Ecological specialization and adaptive decay in digital organisms
Lenski RE, Barrick JE, Ofria C. Balancing Robustness and Evolvability
Misevic D, Ofria C, and Lenski RE. Sexual reproduction reshapes the genetic architecture of digital organisms

Selected scientific publications featuring Avida
 R. E. Lenski, C. Ofria, T. C. Collier, C. Adami (1999). Genomic Complexity, Robustness, and Genetic Interactions in Digital Organisms.  Nature 400:661-664.  Abstract
 C. Adami, C. Ofria, and T.C. Collier (2000). Evolution of biological complexity. "Proceedings of the National Academy of Sciences" 97:4463-4468. Abstract
 C. O. Wilke, J. L. Wang, C. Ofria, R. E. Lenski, and C. Adami (2001). Evolution of Digital Organisms at High Mutation Rate Leads To Survival of the Flattest. Nature 412:331-333 Abstract.
R. E. Lenski, C. Ofria, R. T. Pennock, and C. Adami (2003). The Evolutionary Origin of Complex Features. Nature 423:139-145. Abstract
 S.S. Chow, C.O. Wilke, C. Ofria, R. E. Lenski, and C. Adami (2004). Adaptive Radiation from Resource Competition in Digital Organisms. Science 305:84-86 Abstract.

References

External links
Avida Software
Avida-ED Project,  led by Robert T. Pennock
An Avida Developer's Site
The Evolutionary Origin of Complex Adaptive Features 2003 Nature Paper
2010 Podcast with Carl Zimmer in Microbe WORLD
Ofria's Publications on Google Scholar Citations

Living people
Evolutionary biologists
Researchers of artificial life
Michigan State University faculty
Ward Melville High School alumni
California Institute of Technology alumni
Stony Brook University alumni
1973 births
Stuyvesant High School alumni